Rebekah McKendry (born October 10, 1979) is an American film director, producer, film journalist, and academic. She is best known for her work on Tales of Halloween (2015) and All the Creatures Were Stirring (2017).

Career 
In 2005, McKendry joined the team at Fangoria Entertainment and was heavily involved in project development and production as Director of Marketing. In 2015, she left Fangoria to work for Blumhouse Productions, becoming the Editor-in-Chief of Blumhouse.com.

Along with Elric Kane and Rob Galluzzo, McKendry hosted the Killer POV podcast, which ran for 140 episodes on Geeknation. In 2016, the team moved to Blumhouse.com and were joined by Ryan Turek to form the Shock Waves podcast.

McKendry co-directed her first feature film with her husband David Ian McKendry titled All the Creatures Were Stirring (2017) starring Constance Wu, Jonathan Kite, Amanda Fuller, and Brea Grant.

McKendry is currently a professor at USC School of Cinematic Arts.

In 2021, McKendry co-wrote a horror film reboot of the 2000 film Bring It On with writer Dana Schwartz. The film is being produced by SYFY.

Education 
McKendry has a doctorate focused in Media Studies from Virginia Commonwealth University.

Filmography

Film

Executive producer only

Short films

Television

Awards and nominations

References

External links 
 
 Blumhouse.com
 Shock Waves podcast 
 Killer POV podcast
 Interview with McKendry

Living people
American women film directors
Horror film directors
Virginia Commonwealth University alumni
Fangoria
American women podcasters
American podcasters
University of Southern California faculty
1979 births
American women academics
21st-century American women